Katherine Louise Rawls (June 14, 1917 – April 8, 1982), also known by her married names Katherine Thompson and Katherine Green, was an American competition swimmer and diver.  She was the United States national champion in multiple events during the 1930s.

Swimming career
Rawls was born in Nashville, Tennessee. She learned to swim at the age of two, in Saint Augustine, Florida, and took up diving at the age of seven in Tampa, from a 25-foot (7.6m) platform. During her swimming career she was sometimes called Katy Rawls and nicknamed The Minnow. Her sisters Dorothy (later Mrs. Williams), and Evelyn (McKee), were also Florida state champion swimmers, and the siblings were known collectively as "Rawls' Diving Trio". Together with sister Peggy (Wedgworth) and brother Sonny, a champion diver, the children went to junior contests and exhibitions, as "Rawls' Water Babies".

Rawls caused a sensation at the 1931 U.S. National Championships aged just 14, when she beat star Eleanor Holm in the 300m individual medley in a new world record, and the next day beat champion Margaret Hoffman in the 220yds breaststroke.

Rawls moved from Hollywood, Florida to Fort Lauderdale in 1932. She received sponsorship from Miami Beach to attend the trials for the 1932 Olympics, and was sometimes misidentified with that city. At the trials, she surprisingly failed to qualify in the 200m-meter breaststroke: told by her coach to conserve her strength and aim for the third and last qualifying spot, she narrowly finished fourth. After her loss, she rowed across to the springboard diving, where she surprisingly beat champion Georgia Coleman. She scratched from the high diving because of high winds. She finished second to Coleman at the Olympics.

Rawls beat Coleman again at the National championships that September: one of four victories, the maximum then possible at one meet. She enjoyed sustained success thereafter, often competing in exhibition and carnival events, including a "swim decathlon" in 1934 before a crowd of 50,000, in which she won every event. By 1935, the New York Times made her favorite in seven of the nine events in the upcoming Nationals, depending on which she chose to compete in. Her best swimming events were the individual medley and the distance events, neither of which were Olympic events in the 1930s.  (The medley used only three strokes: the butterfly stroke was not separated from the breaststroke until 1952.)

She succeeded instead in qualifying for the 100-meter freestyle in the 1936 Summer Olympics, finishing seventh in the individual and third in the relay. In the springboard diving competition, she suffered a shock defeat on the last dive, to teammate Marjorie Gestring, who was herself just 13. Subsequently, Rawls concentrated on swimming rather than diving.

In 1937, hours after disembarking at San Francisco after a swimming tour of Japan, she commenced a three-day streak at the Nationals which produced an unprecedented four individual swimming titles. For this she was named Associated Press Female Athlete of the Year for 1937, and polled third for the James E. Sullivan Award. In 1938 she retained all four National titles. At the time she was holder of 18 national swimming records in breaststroke, freestyle, and medley events, and had been undefeated in medley races for eight years.

Rawls retired from swimming in 1939, but returned to diving for the trials for the 1948 Olympics, placing fifth with 108.56 points. Second of the three qualifiers was eventual gold medalist Victoria Draves on 111.14, with Marjorie Gestring fourth on 110.67.

U.S. National championships

Rawls won a total of 33 U.S. national titles: 5 in diving and 28 in swimming, both indoors at the Spring Nationals and outdoors at the Summer Nationals.

 1931 Summer: 1st in 300m medley, 220yd breaststroke; 2nd in springboard diving
 1932 Summer: 1st in 300m medley, 220yd breaststroke, 880yd freestyle, springboard diving
 1933 Spring: 1st in 300yd medley, lowboard diving 
 1933 Summer: 1st in 300m medley, springboard diving; 2nd in 220yd breaststroke
 1934 Spring: 1st in 300yd medley, lowboard diving; 2nd in highboard diving  
 1934 Summer: 1st in 300m medley, springboard diving
 1935 Spring: 1st in 300yd medley, 100yd breaststroke, 100yd freestyle; 2nd in 220yd freestyle
 1935 Summer:  1st in 300m medley, 220yd breaststroke
 1936 Spring: 1st in 300yd medley, 100yd breaststroke
 1936 Summer: 1st in 300m medley
 1937 Spring: 1st in 300yd medley, 100yd breaststroke; 2nd in 500yd freestyle
 1937 Summer: 1st in 300m medley, 440yd, 880yd, & mile freestyle
 1938 Spring: 1st in 300m medley, 100yd breaststroke
 1938 Summer: 1st in 300m medley, 440yd, 880yd, & mile freestyle

Later life
In November 1937, Rawls' parents announced her engagement to an advertising executive named William Starr. On May 18, 1938, unbeknown to her mother, Rawls married Theodore H. Thompson, an airplane pilot. She began working at the Thompson School of Aviation in Fort Lauderdale. She had qualified as a pilot while still swimming. While continuing to swim at exhibitions, she did not compete at the 1939 Nationals, and retired from swimming when the 1940 Olympics ware cancelled owing to the outbreak of World War II. She was one of the initial 28 pilots who formed the Women's Auxiliary Ferrying Squadron in 1942, stationed at Detroit, transporting military cargo by air as part of the U.S. war effort. In 1943, her husband reportedly sued her for divorce, but dropped the charges as caused by a "misunderstanding" and anticipated her return from Detroit to his farm in Florida. Rawls was a swimming instructor for 20 years at The Greenbrier in White Sulphur Springs, West Virginia.
In 1965, she was one of the inaugural inductees to the International Swimming Hall of Fame, and officially opened its pool in Fort Lauderdale, near the former Casino Pool where she had trained in the 1930s. She died from cancer in 1982 after several years of illness.

See also
 List of members of the International Swimming Hall of Fame
 List of athletes with Olympic medals in different disciplines
 List of Olympic medalists in swimming (women)

References

Bibliography

External links

 
 
  Katherine Rawls (USA) – Honor Swimmer profile at International Swimming Hall of Fame

1917 births
1982 deaths
American female freestyle swimmers
Deaths from cancer in West Virginia
Divers at the 1932 Summer Olympics
Divers at the 1936 Summer Olympics
Women aviators
American female divers
Olympic bronze medalists for the United States in swimming
Olympic silver medalists for the United States in swimming
Olympic divers of the United States
Olympic medalists in diving
People from White Sulphur Springs, West Virginia
Sportspeople from Fort Lauderdale, Florida
Sportspeople from Nashville, Tennessee
Swimmers at the 1936 Summer Olympics
Women Airforce Service Pilots personnel
Medalists at the 1932 Summer Olympics
Medalists at the 1936 Summer Olympics
Military personnel from Tennessee
Aviators from Tennessee
The Greenbrier people